Khine is a Burmese first name & surname. Notable people with the surname include:

Chan Chor Khine (1886-1934), Burmese businessman
May Thet Khine (born 1989), Burmese actress
Michelle Khine, American bioengineer
Nan Aye Khine (born 1976), Burmese weightlifter
Phu Pwint Khine, Burmese footballer

Surnames of Burmese origin
Burmese-language surnames
Burmese-language given names